The following are the national records in speed skating in Lithuania maintained by the Lithuanian Skating Federation.

Women

Men

References

External links
Lithuanian Skating Federation

National records in speed skating
Speed skating-related lists
Speed skating
Speed skating
Records